"Crooked Smile" is a song by American hip hop recording artist and record producer J. Cole, released June 4, 2013, as the second official single from his second studio album, Born Sinner (2013). The song was produced by Cole himself, and Elite. The song samples Jennifer Hudson’s "No One Gonna Love You" and features guest vocals from R&B group TLC. The song peaked at number 27 on the US Billboard Hot 100 chart.

Background 
The single features the R&B group TLC who had not released a new single in over seven years since the release of their single "I Bet (feat. O'so Krispie)", which was released in 2005 as part of the digital version of their compilation Now and Forever: The Hits, and as a promotional cut from their reality series R U the Girl. An editor from Billboard commented on the song saying: "The Born Sinner track is an uplifting ode to all those who continue to hold their heads up, especially women, and the importance of inner beauty." The original version of Crooked Smile was released January 28, 2014 on Dreamville's compilation mixtape titled Revenge of the Dreamers, the song samples "Str8 Ballin'" by 2Pac.

Composition 
J. Cole raps the verses, and TLC sings the chorus. Throughout the verses, J. Cole talks about the women who are insecure about what they look like, and tells them they look good. He also talks about the things people do to make themselves look good, when inside they want to be the same person they were, even before doing all those things. In the chorus, TLC sings about the people who kept them down, but also break free from. At the end of the song, the choir hums the chorus.

Music video 
After Cole and TLC had teased the music video for over a month, on September 18, 2013 the video was released. TLC does not appear in the video with J. Cole but their verses are featured. It is dedicated to Aiyana Stanley-Jones.

Live performances 
J. Cole performed the song, along with his other single "Power Trip" from his second album, at the 2013 BET Awards on June 30, 2013. On August 13, 2013, he performed the song on Conan.

Accolades 
Rolling Stone ranked the song at number 37 on their list of the 100 Best Songs of 2013. The song was nominated for The Ashford and Simpson Songwriter’s Award at the 2013 Soul Train Music Awards. The music video was nominated for a 2014 MTV Video Music Award for Best Video With A Social Message.

Awards and nominations

Charts

Weekly charts

Year-end charts

Certifications

Radio and release history

References

2013 singles
J. Cole songs
TLC (group) songs
Roc Nation singles
Songs written by J. Cole
Song recordings produced by J. Cole
Songs written by Meleni Smith
Columbia Records singles